Finland competed at the 2017 World Games in Wrocław, Poland, 20–30 July 2017.

Medals

Team

Archery 

Finland won 3 national quota places at the 2016 World Field Archery Championships: 1 in Recurve Men, 1 in Barebow Men and 1 in Barebow Women.

Legend: W = win, L = loss

Bowling 

Finland received a quota of two men and two women during the European Men Championship 2016 and European Women Championship 2016.

Singles 

Legend: L = loss, Q = qualified

Doubles 

Legend: Q = qualified, W = win, L = loss

Finswimming

Floorball 

Finland qualified a floorball team as the gold medalist of the 2016 Men's World Floorball Championships.

Legend: G = Goalie, D = Defender, F = Forward

Legend: W = win, L = loss

Indoor rowing 

Finland received a quota spot for Women's Lightweight 2000 meter and Open 500 meter events based on the Concept2 world ranking.

Muaythai 

Gia Winberg received a wild card from the International Federation of Muaythai Amateur to the women's 60 kg event.

Legend: WP = win on points, LP = loss on points

Orienteering 

Finland placed among the best 13 nations in the 2016 World Orienteering Championships and received a national quota of 2 man and 2 woman runners.

Powerlifting 

Antti Savolainen qualified as 3rd in the 66 kg class and Kenneth Sandvik received a reserve spot based on his Wilks Score in the 120+ kg class in the 2016 World Powerlifting Championships.

Legend: SQ = squat, BP = bench press, DL = deadlift, Points = total kg multiplied by Wilks Coefficient

Squash 

Legend: L = loss

Waterskiing 

International Waterski & Wakeboard Federation selected Jutta Menestrina for Women's Jump event based on her world rank.

Legend: Q = qualified

References 

Nations at the 2017 World Games
2017 in Finnish sport
2017